Hunter Owen may refer to:

Hunter Owen (baseball) (born 1993), American baseball player
Hunter Owen (EastEnders), a fictional character on British soap opera EastEnders